Joel Swift (born 14 June 1990) is a water polo player of Australia. He was part of the Australian team at the  2015 World Aquatics Championships, as well as being part of the team which went to the 2016 Olympics in Rio de Janeiro. Swift is an indigenous Australian.

References

External links
 

Australian male water polo players
Living people
Place of birth missing (living people)
1990 births
Water polo players at the 2016 Summer Olympics
Olympic water polo players of Australia
Indigenous Australian Olympians